Agriocnemis pygmaea (pygmy wisp) is a species of damselfly in the family Coenagrionidae.
It is also known as wandering midget, pygmy dartlet or wandering wisp. It is well distributed across Asia and parts of Australia.

Description and habitat
It is a small damselfly with black capped green eyes, black thorax with apple green stripes on lateral sides. Segments 1 to 7 of its abdomen is black on dorsum and pale green on ventral half. The remaining segments are orange-red. Very old males may get  pruinosed on the dorsum of the head and the thorax with snowy white, making all the markings beneath being quite obscured. Female is more robust and exhibits several color morphs. The green color of the male is replaced by red in the females in the red forms. In androchrome forms, the female has same green colors as in the male. Female colour variation is depended on ontogenic colour change
associated with sexual development too.

It breeds in marshes and ponds.

Etymology
The species name pygmaea is from the Greek word for pygmy. In 1842, Jules Pierre Rambur, writing in Latin, started his description of this damselfly: Minimum obscure viridi aenum - very small dark green copper.

Gallery

See also
 List of odonates of India
 List of odonata of Kerala
 List of Odonata species of Australia

References 

Coenagrionidae
Odonata of Asia
Odonata of Australia
Insects of India
Insects of Sri Lanka
Insects of Vietnam
Insects of Thailand
Insects of Australia
Taxa named by Jules Pierre Rambur
Insects described in 1842
Damselflies